"Birth of the Cruel" is a song by American heavy metal band Slipknot. Produced by Greg Fidelman, it was released as the third single from the band's sixth studio album We Are Not Your Kind on August 5, 2019.

Background  
"Birth of the Cruel" was released on August 5, 2019 as the band's third single off their sixth studio album We Are Not Your Kind, following after the release of Solway Firth the previous month. It would be the last single to be released prior to the album's release and was debuted on Zane Lowe's 'World Record' segment on his Beats 1 radio show on Apple Music.

The title is a play on Birth of the Cool, a 1957 compilation album by jazz trumpeter Miles Davis.

Critical reception 
The reception was generally positive for "Birth of the Cruel". Reviewing the song for Metal Hammer, Merlin Alderslade described it as "a stomping, menacing, groove-heavy killer out of the Robb Flynn songbook", which to him sounded more "brooding" and "sinister" than previous singles "Unsainted" and "Solway Firth". Corey Taylor's vocals were described as "a maniacal conductor whom is at the head of the world's most demented symphony". Jordan Bassett of NME had something similar to say, and did so by breaking down the ominous lyrics to summarize the song. "A drone-like verse gives way to a claustrophobic and taut refrain whose lyrics – "We are the bitter, the maladjusted" – suggests that Slipknot 2019 has much in common with Slipknot 1999".

During an interview between Corey Taylor with Zane Lowe on his Beats 1 Radio Show, Lowe would comment on "Birth of the Cruel", mentioning how the song reminded him of Alice in Chains. In response, Taylor would state the following: "Absolutely. It's dark, man. It’s real, but it still pulls you in and just, it's that lurch."

Charts

References  

2019 songs
2019 singles
Slipknot (band) songs
Roadrunner Records singles
Songs written by Corey Taylor
Songs written by Shawn Crahan
Songs written by Jim Root